Mario Lucini (born 18 September 1958) is an Italian politician. He is member of the Democratic Party. He is a geologist by trade and was the mayor of Como, Lombardy from 21 May 2012 to 27 June 2017.

References

External links 

Living people
1958 births
Democratic Party (Italy) politicians
Mayors of Como
21st-century Italian politicians